HS or Hs can stand for:

Businesses and brands
 HS Produkt, a Croatian firearms manufacturer
 Helsingin Sanomat, a newspaper in Finland
 Hawker Siddeley, aircraft manufacturing group
 Henschel & Son, in aircraft prefixes; e.g., Hs 117
 Head & Shoulders or H&S, a shampoo brand
 Harris Scarfe and HS Home, a chain of Australian department stores

Science and technology

Chemistry
 Hassium, symbol Hs, a chemical element
 Bisulfide, HS−, a chemical compound derived from H2S
 Mercapto radical, •, a radical molecule
 Hun stuff (a World War I name for mustard gas)

Medicine
 hs, medical abbreviation for "hours of sleep"
 h.s., medical abbreviation for the Latin phrase hora somni ("at bedtime")
 Hereditary spherocytosis, a genetic disorder marked by hemolytic anemia
 Hidradenitis suppurativa, a skin condition affecting apocrine sweat glands and hair follicles

Other uses in science and technology
 '.hs', the Haskell programming language's typical filename extension
 Heat sink
 Higman–Sims group, in mathematics
 Hypothetical syllogism, a proof rule in classical logic
 Horizon scanning, a method from futures studies

Vehicles
 Curtiss HS, an American patrol flying boat
 Lexus HS, a Japanese compact hybrid sedan
 MG HS, a Chinese-British compact SUV
 YTHS HS, a Chinese unmanned aerial vehicle series

Other uses
 Harlem Spartans, a British hip hop collective
 Harmonized System, the Harmonized Commodity Description and Coding System of tariff nomenclature
 Sestertius, an ancient Roman coin
 High school (secondary education)
 Solar Hijri calendar (= Hijri Shamsi)
 Holy Spirit
 HS postcode area, covering the Outer Hebrides, Scotland
 SS-Heimatschutz Slowakei (HS), a German paramilitary group in Slovakia during World War II
 Thailand (aircraft registration prefix HS)